The drab seedeater (Sporophila simplex) is a species of bird in the family Thraupidae.
It is found in Ecuador and Peru.
Its natural habitats are subtropical or tropical dry shrubland, subtropical or tropical moist shrubland, and subtropical or tropical high-altitude shrubland.

References

Sporophila
Birds described in 1874
Taxa named by Władysław Taczanowski
Taxonomy articles created by Polbot